Francis Burns (born 17 October 1948 in Glenboig, North Lanarkshire) is a Scottish former footballer.

Playing career

Manchester United
Burns was a talented left-back and captained Scotland Schoolboys and won Scottish Youth international honours. He joined Manchester United in 1965  and made his first team debut in September 1967. There, he made 121 league appearances, scoring 6 goals and won one Scotland cap on 5 November 1969, against Austria. This was the only full international cap he ever gained.

He played in six of the matches in Manchester United's run to the 1968 European Cup final, although he lost his place in the final to Shay Brennan. During his time at Old Trafford he underwent three cartilage operations.

Southampton
Burns was signed by Ted Bates for £50,000 for Southampton in 1972. Unfortunately, his injury jinx continued and he required a further cartilage operation as well as suffering a serious thigh injury. He was unable to displace Joe Kirkup as the first-choice left-back and towards the end of the season he lost his place to up and coming youngster Steve Mills. He made 21 league appearances for the Saints, before moving back to Lancashire.

Preston North End
He became former United teammate Bobby Charlton's first signing as manager of Preston North End in 1973, making his debut for the Deepdale club against Aston Villa on 25 August 1973 and ended his first season being named as the club's Player of the Year. He made a total of 314 appearances (including 2 as substitute) and scored 9 league goals for Preston.

Shamrock Rovers
He moved to Shamrock Rovers in October 1981 making his debut on the 11th at Glenmalure Park. In total he made 20 appearances which included a League Cup Final loss on New Year's Eve. His experience and motivational qualities were a big help to that young Hoops side.

After football
In February 1987, he emigrated to Perth, Western Australia where he set up an industrial cleaning business as well as coaching in local football.

References

External links
 

1948 births
Footballers from North Lanarkshire
Living people
Scottish footballers
Scottish expatriate footballers
Scotland international footballers
Manchester United F.C. players
Southampton F.C. players
Preston North End F.C. players
Shamrock Rovers F.C. players
League of Ireland players
Scottish emigrants to Australia
Association football fullbacks
English Football League players
Expatriate association footballers in the Republic of Ireland
Scottish expatriate sportspeople in Ireland
Scotland youth international footballers
Scotland under-23 international footballers